Huxter is a crofting township in southeastern Whalsay in the parish of Nesting in the Shetland islands of Scotland. It lies to the east of Symbister, just north of the Loch of Huxter. Huxter Fort is located in the vicinity, reached by foot along a causeway.

References

External links

Canmore - Whalsay, Loch of Huxter Fort site record
Canmore - Whalsay, Huxter Horizontal Mill site record

Villages in Whalsay